Ain't Misbehavin' is the fourth studio album by the British heavy metal band Tokyo Blade, released in 1987 by the German GAMA Musikverlag sub-label Scratch Records. The album was recorded with a completely new line-up assembled by Andy Boulton after the disbandment of Tokyo Blade, following the commercial failure of Black Hearts & Jaded Spades and the disastrous tour of 1986. In fact, the band is indicated as 'Andy Boulton's Tokyo Blade' on the front cover of the European edition.

Ain't Misbehavin''' was re-released in 1993 by Laserlight Records with the title Tokyo Blade, with different cover art and three bonus tracks, "1000 Years, "The Eye of the Storm", and "Chains of Love", which were also released in 1989 on the original pressing of No Remorse''.

Track listing
All tracks by Peter Zito and Andy Boulton, except "Heartbreaker" and "Too Much Too Soon" by Andy Boulton
Side one
 "Heartbreaker" – 4:34
 "Too Much Too Soon" – 3:25
 "Watch Your Step" – 3:38
 "Movie Star" – 4:01

Side two
 "Hot for Love" – 4:18
 "Tokyo City" – 4:16
 "Love and Hate" – 4:26
 "Don't Walk Away" – 4:56
 "Ain't Misbehavin'" – 1:38

Personnel

Tokyo Blade
Peter Zito – vocals
Andy Boulton – guitar, backing vocals
Chris Stover – bass
Alex Lee – drums, backing vocals

Production
Tom Krüger – producer, engineer, mixing

References

1987 albums
Tokyo Blade albums